The 2018 TicketGuardian 500 was a Monster Energy NASCAR Cup Series race held on March 11, 2018, at ISM Raceway in Avondale, Arizona. Contested over 312 laps on the  oval, it was the fourth race of the 2018 Monster Energy NASCAR Cup Series season. It would also be the last Phoenix race to be using the 2011 reconfiguration as the start/finish line will be moved to the back-straightaway just past turn two for the November race.

Report

Background

ISM Raceway, is a one-mile, low-banked tri-oval race track located in Avondale, Arizona. The motorsport track opened in 1964 and currently hosts two NASCAR race weekends annually. PIR has also hosted the IndyCar Series, CART, USAC and the Rolex Sports Car Series. The raceway is currently owned and operated by International Speedway Corporation.

Entry list

First practice

Qualifying

Qualifying results

Practice (post-qualifying)

Second practice

Final practice

Race

First stage

Start 
Martin Truex Jr.led the field to the green flag at 3:44 p.m. The afternoon’s first caution flew when the engine in Corey LaJoie’s car blew on lap 25. NASCAR had planned to have a competition caution on lap 35 but blended it into the lap-25 yellow.

The race restarted on lap 34. Kyle Larson took the lead on the same lap and led 24 laps, but then Kyle Busch took the lead and scored his first stage win of the season, leading at lap 75. Following in the top 10 were Kevin Harvick, Kyle Larson, Denny Hamlin, Martin Truex Jr.,  Chase Elliott, Brad Keselowski, Kurt Busch, Joey Logano and Erik Jones. The second caution flew for conclusion of the first stage.

Second stage 
The race restarted on lap 84 and it remained green for 39 laps, until Kyle Larson lost control of his car on lap 121, slid through turn four and brought out the race’s third caution. Larson’s rear tires had been shaking before the incident.

The race restarted on lap 12. Kyle Busch took the lead on lap 129 and led 19 laps. A blown right front tire sent Chris Buescher’s car into the fourth-turn wall on lap 147, causing the fourth caution.

The race restarted on lap 150. The second stage ended with a one-lap dash because of a restart. Kurt Busch held off Brad Keselowski to win. Also in the top 10 were Ricky Stenhouse Jr., Kyle Busch, Michael McDowell, Ty Dillon, Kevin Harvick, Martin Truex Jr., Kasey Kahne and Clint Bowyer. The fifth caution flew for conclusion of the second stage.

Final stage 

The race restarted on lap 159 and remained green for 33 laps. The sixth caution flew when Paul Menard, who had reported brake issues, slid in turn two and backed hard into the outside wall, crushing the car’s rear end.

The race restarted on lap 199. Kevin Harvick held off Kyle Busch and Harvick scored his third career victory of 2018.

Post race 
“This weekend felt like a playoff moment for us,” Harvick said. “When you have all the guys and everybody looking at the race car and the determination for every last detail. There's a lot going on in the world, but our team is very good at setting those things aside for 10 weeks during the playoffs. It felt more important to win a race this week than to win a race at Homestead for the championship.

“Actions speak a whole lot louder than words.”

Stage Results

Stage 1
Laps: 75

Stage 2
Laps: 75

Final Stage Results

Stage 3
Laps: 162

Race statistics
 Lead changes: 9 among different drivers
 Cautions/Laps: 6 for 36
 Red flags: 0
 Time of race: 2 hours, 53 minutes and 13 seconds
 Average speed:

Media

Television
Fox Sports covered their 14th race at the Phoenix International Raceway. Mike Joy, two-time Phoenix winner Jeff Gordon and Darrell Waltrip had the call in the booth for the race. Jamie Little, Vince Welch and Matt Yocum handled the pit road duties for the television side.

Radio
MRN had the radio call for the race which also was simulcasted on Sirius XM NASCAR Radio.

Standings after the race

Drivers' Championship standings

Manufacturers' Championship standings

Note: Only the first 16 positions are included for the driver standings.

References

2018 in sports in Arizona
2018 Monster Energy NASCAR Cup Series
March 2018 sports events in the United States
NASCAR races at Phoenix Raceway